Julia Penny Clark is an American attorney who has argued employee benefits law cases before the United States Supreme Court.

Biography
Clark was born in Oak Grove, Louisiana, and raised in Waco, Texas, where she attended La Vega High School. She studied at the University of Texas, and received a B.A., Phi Beta Kappa, in 1969. She continued her studies at the University of Texas School of Law, serving as an editor of the Texas Law Review, and graduating Order of the Coif and Chancellor honors with a J.D. in 1973. After law school, she clerked for Judge J. Braxton Craven, Jr. of the United States Court of Appeals for the Fourth Circuit, and then for Associate Justice of the United States Supreme Court Lewis F. Powell Jr. from 1974 to 1975. She was among the first dozen women to clerk at the U.S. Supreme Court.

Following her clerkships, she stayed in Washington, D.C. and since 1975 has practiced law at Bredhoff & Kaiser, PLLC, where she is a partner. She has argued two cases before the U.S. Supreme Court. In 2006, she argued  the employee benefits case of Beck v. PACE International Union, 551 U.S. 96 (2007). In 2014, she argued M&G Polymers USA, LLC v. Tackett, 135 S. Ct. 926 (2015), concerning collective bargaining agreements under the Employee Retirement Income Security Act (ERISA). She represented Tackett and a group of retirees who sought to maintain healthcare benefits under a collective bargaining agreement. She has also argued several cases before the United States Courts of Appeal, including recently in the Second Circuit, Osberg v. Foot Locker, Inc. 862 F.3d 198 (2d Cir. 2017).

She was a member of the Advisory Committee on Admissions and Grievances for the United States Court of Appeals for the District of Columbia Circuit, 1990–1996.

Personal life
Clark is married to William Curtis Bryson, a senior judge of the United States Court of Appeals for the Federal Circuit. They have two daughters. They met in law school, and both were law clerks at the U.S. Supreme Court.

See also
 List of law clerks of the Supreme Court of the United States (Seat 1)

References

Selected publications

External links
 Cases argued at the U.S. Supreme Court, Oyez.org
 Law firm bio
 Bio Board of Trustees, The Thirteen Choir

Year of birth missing (living people)
1940s births
Living people
People from Oak Grove, Louisiana
20th-century American lawyers
21st-century American lawyers
Lawyers from Washington, D.C.
University of Texas alumni
University of Texas School of Law alumni
Law clerks of the Supreme Court of the United States
Labour lawyers